Ronnie Irving Wingo Jr. (born February 18, 1991) is an American football running back. He played college football at Arkansas. He has also been a member of the Atlanta Falcons and Buffalo Bills. He was also a former Assistant Coach for the Affton High School freshman football team.

Early years
He attended St. Louis University High School in St. Louis, Missouri. He was selected to the U.S. Army All-American Bowl West team and was selected to the first-team Class 6A all-state team. He rushed for 4,449 yards and scored 48 touchdowns in high school.

College career
Wingo attended the University of Arkansas from 2009 to 2012.

Freshman
In his freshman season, he rushed for 319 yards on 49 carries (6.5 avg) and 3 rushing touchdowns. He also recorded 5 receptions, for 99 yards and one touchdown.

Sophomore
In his sophomore season, he rushed for 253 yards on 41 carries (6.2 avg) and one touchdown. He recorded a career-high 27 receptions, for 274 yards receiving yards and 4 touchdowns.

Junior
In his junior season, he rushed for a career best 458 yards on 104 carries (4.4 avg) and one touchdown. He also recorded 20 receptions, for 187 yards and 2 touchdowns.

Senior
In his senior season, he rushed for 59 yards on 12 carries (4.9 avg) and one touchdown. He also recorded 7 receptions for 50 yards.

Professional career

Atlanta Falcons
On April 27, 2013, he signed with the Atlanta Falcons as undrafted free agent following the 2013 NFL Draft.

Buffalo Bills
On September 2, 2013, he signed with the Buffalo Bills to the practice squad. Due to C. J. Spiller being hurt and the Bills released Brandon Burton he was signed off the practice squad to be the third string running back. The Bills released Wingo on August 25, 2014.

Atlanta Falcons (II)
Wingo was signed to the Falcons' practice squad on December 23, 2014. He was released by the Falcons on May 1, 2015.

Hamilton Tiger-Cats 
After a series of injuries Ronnie Wingo was added to the Hamilton Tiger-Cats' practice roster on September 1, 2015. On April 15, 2016 Wingo was offered a new contract for the 2016 season.

Personal life
He is the son of Ronnie, Sr. and Tiffany Wingo. His major while at College was sociology. As of 2013, he was 6 feet 2 inches, approximately 231 pounds with a speed of 4.47.

References

External links 
 Arkansas Razorbacks bio
 Atlanta Falcons page 
 Buffalo Bills bio

1991 births
Living people
Atlanta Falcons players
American football running backs
Buffalo Bills players
Arkansas Razorbacks football players